The Audenshaw Junction rail accident occurred on the evening of 20 May 1970 near Guide Bridge railway station, Greater Manchester, England. A Class 506 electric multiple unit train from Manchester Piccadilly to Hadfield had started away from a signal when a set of points moved underneath the train, causing it to be derailed and throwing the centre carriage onto its side. Two passengers were killed and 13 were injured.

Investigation

The investigation found that the signalman at Stockport Junction signal box was at fault.

The lever frame at Stockport Junction was equipped with electro-pneumatic slides instead of levers, with electrical economising contacts located above them. The signalman wanted to cross a freight train travelling in the opposite direction behind the passenger train, but the points were locked by a track circuit until the passenger train was well clear of them.

In order to defeat the interlocking and speed things up, he had pulled the points slide slightly out of the frame. This action held the protecting signal at red as a safety measure, so in order to clear it, he obtained a false feed between two of the economiser contacts, most likely using a Bardic lamp or a broken hinge that was subsequently found. It was likely that he then accidentally inched the points slide too far, and they moved under the train.

False-feeding was apparently common knowledge between signalmen in the 10 similar signal boxes in the area, and the frames were subsequently boxed in.

See also
Connington South rail crash

References

Sources
 
 Department of the Environment, accident report

Railway accidents and incidents in Greater Manchester
Railway accidents in 1970
1970 in England
1970s in Lancashire
Derailments in England
Accidents and incidents involving British Rail
May 1970 events in the United Kingdom
Railway accidents caused by signaller's error
1970 disasters in the United Kingdom
Audenshaw